The First-tier Tribunal is part of the courts and tribunals service of the United Kingdom. It was created in 2008 as part of a programme, enacted in the Tribunals, Courts and Enforcement Act 2007, to rationalise the tribunal system, and has since taken on the functions of 20 previously existing tribunals. It is administered by His Majesty's Courts and Tribunals Service.

Chambers and jurisdiction

The tribunal currently consists of seven chambers, structured around subject areas (although the General Regulatory Chamber has a very broad remit). The chambers may be divided into sections, mirroring the jurisdictions inherited from the tribunals which have been merged into the First-tier Tribunal. Different jurisdictions have been transferred into the tribunal in a programme which began in 2008 and is continuing.

Judiciary

The judiciary of the First-tier Tribunal comprises tribunal judges and other members. Legally qualified members of the former tribunals became Tribunal Judges of the First-tier Tribunal when their jurisdiction was transferred, whilst the lay members (often with expertise in the subject matter of the former tribunal) became other members. New judges and members are appointed by the Judicial Appointments Commission.

In addition, the following may also sit as Judges of the First-tier Tribunal:
 Judges of the Upper Tribunal
 Court of Appeal judges 
 Court of Session judges 
 High Court judges
 Circuit judges and sheriffs
 District judges and district judges (magistrates' courts)

The First-tier Tribunal is presided over by the Senior President of Tribunals, since 19 September 2020 Sir Keith Lindblom. Each chamber of the First-tier Tribunal is headed by a chamber president, and within each chamber each section or jurisdiction is headed by a principal judge.

In most cases, decisions are made by a judge and two other members, although this can vary between chambers and sections, and also depending on the case concerned.

Judges may be permanent office hours, known as salaried judges, or part time, known as fee paid judges.

Appeal
In most cases, appeals against decisions of the First-tier Tribunal can be made to the Upper Tribunal, but only with the permission of the First-tier Tribunal or the Upper Tribunal. Before deciding whether to grant permission to Appeal to the Upper Tribunal, the First Tier Tribunal must consider whether to subject its own decision to 'Reconsideration'. In the case of Criminal Injuries Compensation and Asylum Support cases, there is technically no right of appeal, but a decision may be reviewed by way of an application to the Upper Tribunal for judicial review of the First-tier Tribunal's decision.

External links
 Tribunals, Ministry of Justice
 Tribunal Decisions, Judiciary of England and Wales

References

Law of the United Kingdom
United Kingdom administrative law
United Kingdom tribunals
2008 establishments in the United Kingdom
Courts and tribunals established in 2008